Goniochaeta fuscibasis is a species of parasitic fly in the family Tachinidae.

Distribution
United States

References

Diptera of North America
Taxa named by John Merton Aldrich
Dexiinae
Insects described in 1926